In professional wrestling, the NWA World Title Tournament was a live supercard held by the Philadelphia, Pennsylvania, United States-based professional wrestling promotion NWA Eastern Championship Wrestling (ECW) on August 27, 1994. The event featured a tournament for the vacant NWA World Heavyweight Championship. The commentator for the event was Joey Styles. Highlights from the event aired on the August 29, 1994 episode of ECW Hardcore TV, while the tournament final and the bout between Shane Douglas and 2 Cold Scorpio appeared on the 2012 WWE DVD and Blu-ray release ECW Unreleased: Vol 1; the bout between 911 and Doink the Clown appeared on the 2013 WWE Blu-ray release ECW Unreleased: Vol 2; and the bout between Cactus Jack and Mikey Whipwreck and the Public Enemy was included in the 2005 compilation DVD BloodSport - The Most Violent Matches of ECW.

The event is known for the speech given by the tournament winner, ECW Heavyweight Champion Shane Douglas, who dropped the NWA World Heavyweight Championship belt and proclaimed the ECW Heavyweight Championship to be a world championship. Douglas' speech presaged the emergence of ECW - renamed Extreme Championship Wrestling shortly after the event - as a nationally recognized promotion and the continued decline in the power and profile of the NWA. The event has been described by WWE as "one of the most controversial incidents to ever occur at any sports entertainment event". Douglas described his throwing down of the title as "the defining moment for [his] career".

Background

The NWA World Heavyweight Championship was the principal championship recognized by professional wrestling promotions affiliated with the National Wrestling Alliance (NWA). By the early 1990s, the largest NWA affiliate was World Championship Wrestling (WCW). In 1993, the relationship between WCW and the NWA board of directors began to deteriorate. In September 1993, WCW withdrew from the NWA and the NWA World Heavyweight Championship - held by WCW employee Ric Flair - was vacated.

After the title had been vacant for several months, NWA board member Dennis Coralluzzo proposed holding a tournament to crown a new NWA World Heavyweight Champion. Tod Gordon and Paul Heyman - the owner and booker of the NWA affiliate Eastern Championship Wrestling (ECW) - wrote to the board of directors proposing that ECW host the tournament given that it had more television exposure than any other NWA affiliate. The board of directors accepted the proposal. Ostensibly unbeknownst to the board of directors, Gordon and Heyman - who had previously had disagreements with Coralluzzo - planned to use the tournament to publicly break away from the NWA and springboard ECW to prominence. Gordon and Heyman approached Shane Douglas, the planned winner of the tournament, who agreed to their plan.

Event

The event featured an eight-man tournament for the vacant championship. The tournament began with Dean Malenko defeating the Japanese wrestler Osamu Nishimura by submission using a standing figure-four leglock, followed by 911 squashing the surprise wild card entrant, Doink the Clown, with a series of chokeslams. Shane Douglas, the-then ECW Heavyweight Champion, pinned the Tazmaniac with a roll-up, followed by 2 Cold Scorpio defeating Chris Benoit in an "aerial showcase" by reversing Benoit's superplex into a small package. In the semi-finals, 2 Cold Scorpio defeated 911 by count-out after 911 was distracted by Douglas (disguised as Doink the Clown), while Douglas pinned Dean Malenko following two piledrivers. In the final bout of the tournament, Douglas pinned 2 Cold Scorpio following a belly-to-belly suplex.

After being presented with the NWA World Heavyweight Championship belt, Douglas began to deliver an acceptance speech before abruptly throwing down the title belt and instead picking up the ECW Heavyweight Championship belt, proclaiming himself to be the "ECW Heavyweight Champion of the world".

The event was also scheduled to host a tag team bout for the ECW Tag Team Championship between champions the Public Enemy (Johnny Grunge and Rocco Rock) and challengers Cactus Jack and Terry Funk. After Funk was forced to withdraw from the event due to missing a flight, Tommy Dreamer was teased as Funk's replacement but was attacked by the Public Enemy, with Rocco Rock putting him through a table using a diving senton. Mikey Whipwreck was then announced as Funk's surprise replacement. Cactus Jack and Whipwreck went on to score an upset victory over the Public Enemy, with Whipwreck pinning Rock after Cactus Jack jostled him while he was on the top rope, causing him to fall and hit his groin on the ring rope.

Aftermath
Dennis Coralluzzo was interviewed immediately after the event, referring to Douglas' actions as "a disgrace" and stating that he would move to have Douglas stripped of both championships. There are conflicting accounts as to whether Coralluzzo was aware in advance that Douglas intended to throw down the belt.

On the August 29, 1994 episode of ECW Hardcore TV, Tod Gordon delivered a promo stating that Eastern Championship Wrestling had withdrawn from the NWA, and renamed Extreme Championship Wrestling, and would recognise Shane Douglas as its world heavyweight champion.

The ECW Tag Team Championship and ECW Television Championship were also renamed the ECW World Tag Team Championship and ECW World Television Championship.

The NWA World Heavyweight Championship remained vacant until November 19, 1994, when Chris Candido won a tournament in Cherry Hill, New Jersey hosted by Smoky Mountain Wrestling, defeating Tracy Smothers in the finals. Douglas' actions have been described as "killing the title's credibility forever".

Results

Tournament brackets

See also
1994 in professional wrestling

References

External links

1994 in Pennsylvania
1994 in professional wrestling
Extreme Championship Wrestling shows
National Wrestling Alliance shows
Professional wrestling controversies
Professional wrestling in Philadelphia
Professional wrestling tournaments